Taste is the debut studio album by English alternative rock band The Telescopes, released in 1989 on What Goes On Records. The album was produced by Richard Formby and engineered by Ken MacPherson and Chris Bell. After What Goes On folded, it was re-released in 1990 by Cheree, and it was later released in 2006 by Rev-Ola Records to include live versions of "There Is No Floor", "Sadness Pale", "Threadbare" and "Suicide".

In 2016, Pitchfork ranked Taste at number 47 on its list of the 50 best shoegaze albums of all time.

Track listing

References

1989 debut albums
Albums produced by Richard Formby
The Telescopes albums